The sixth season of the American television series Bones premiered on September 23, 2010, and concluded on May 19, 2011, on Fox. The show maintained its previous time slot, airing on Thursdays at 8:00 pm ET and then moved to Thursdays at 9:00 pm ET in 2011. The season consisted of 23 episodes and introduced a spin-off series The Finder in the 19th episode which has the same name.

Cast and characters

Main cast 
Emily Deschanel as Dr. Temperance "Bones" Brennan, a forensic anthropologist
David Boreanaz as FBI Special Agent Seeley Booth, who is the official FBI liaison with the Jeffersonian
Michaela Conlin as Angela Montenegro, a forensic artist and wife of Jack Hodgins 
Tamara Taylor as Dr. Camille "Cam" Saroyan, a forensic pathologist and the head of the forensic division
T. J. Thyne as Dr. Jack Hodgins, an entomologist and husband of Angela Montenegro
John Francis Daley as Dr. Lance Sweets, an FBI psychologist, who provides psychological reports on criminals and staff including Brennan and Booth

Recurring cast 
Patricia Belcher as Caroline Julian, a prosecutor
Ryan O'Neal as Max Keenan, Brennan's father
Ty Panitz as Parker Booth, Booth's son
Katheryn Winnick as Hannah Burley, a journalist and Booth's girlfriend
Arnold Vosloo as Jacob Broadsky, a professional sniper who was Booth's friend
Elon Gold as Dr. Paul Lidner, Cam's boyfriend
Tiffany Hines as Michelle Welton, Cam's adopted daughter

Billy Gibbons as "himself", Angela's father
Deirdre Lovejoy as Heather Taffet
Scott Lowell as Dr. Douglas Filmore, a Canadian podiatrist
Tina Majorino as Special Agent Genevieve Shaw

Interns
Michael Grant Terry as Wendell Bray
Ryan Cartwright as Vincent Nigel-Murray
Eugene Byrd as Dr. Clark Edison
Carla Gallo as Daisy Wick
Joel David Moore as Colin Fisher
Pej Vahdat as Arastoo Vaziri

Production
Storylines for the sixth season include the final return of Heather Taffet, aka the Gravedigger (Deirdre Lovejoy), as well as the introduction of a new recurring antagonist, sniper named Jacob Broadsky (portrayed by Arnold Vosloo). David Boreanaz directed episodes 11 (produced as 10) and 16 of this season.

Emily Deschanel was originally scheduled to make her directorial debut with episode 14 of this season, a Valentine's Day wedding episode, but this was postponed due to episodes 13 and 14 airing during February sweeps when Brennan's character would have had an unfavorably smaller presence, as Deschanel would have had to be prepping to direct her episode. Deschanel did not end up directing an episode due to scheduling conflicts, and though she planned on directing an episode in the next season, she did not direct until six years later, on season 12’s "The Hope in the Horror".

After dropping the idea of a black-and-white episode the previous season, creator Hart Hanson revealed the "out of the box" episode this season would be a story shown completely from Brennan's point of view after she identifies with a victim who resembles her, "meaning we will see the world the way she sees it. We hope this will give a little insight into how Brennan perceives all around her".

Intern Vincent Nigel-Murray Ryan Cartwright, introduced as a recurring character in season four, was killed off in the penultimate episode of this season, shot by sniper Jacob Broadsky. Series creator Hart Hanson explained the reasoning for this decision was due to the television series Alphas being picked up, in which Cartwright is a series regular. Hanson explained, "We knew [his exit] would happen before the end of this season, so the story has been in the works for a while. We knew that one of our squints, who are [played by] very, very talented actors, would get a job". Hanson also explained that, "He's a well-beloved character... probably the favorite squint of the audience, so we decided to kill him for the heartbreak".

Episode 4 features the character Professor Bunsen Jude "The Science Dude", which is inspired by real-life person Bill Nye "the Science Guy", having a similar name and a children's science show.

Spin-off series 

In October 2010, it was revealed that Fox was developing a potential spin-off series that would be built around a new recurring character that would be introduced in the sixth season. The potential spin-off series would also be created by Bones creator/executive producer Hart Hanson, and be based on The Locator series of two books written by Richard Greener.  The character of Walter is described as an eccentric but amusing recluse in high demand for his ability to find anything.  He is skeptical of everything—he suffered brain damage while overseas, which explains his constant paranoia—and known for asking offensive, seemingly irrelevant questions to get to the truth. Production on the episode was scheduled to begin in December 2010, but was delayed to early 2011 due to creative differences.

Creator Hart Hanson posted on Twitter (in a humorous manner) regarding the notes he got from the network, "I received studio notes on the Bones spin-off idea. They want it to be better. Unreasonable taskmasters. Impossible dreamers. Neo-platonists." During Fox's TCA press tour, executive producer Stephen Nathan revealed production on the episode featuring The Locator began in February 2011, with the episode airing in April.

In the episode, Booth and Brennan travel to Key West, Florida, where the spin-off is said to take place.  Nathan went on to say regarding the casting of character, "You want to find people you want to see every single week do one unique character. That's why when you have Hugh Laurie, who is essentially playing a very unlikable character, you love to see him. And that is a rare, rare quality to find. And the finder won't be an unlikeable character, but because it is a unique character, it's difficult to find just the right person." Geoff Stults was cast as the lead character with Michael Clarke Duncan and Saffron Burrows cast as the other two lead characters. The three characters were introduced in episode 19 of the sixth season.

The Finder was picked up for the 2011–12 season on May 10, 2011 with an order of 13 episodes. It was later cancelled on May 9, 2012.

Episodes

DVD and Blu-ray release 
The sixth season of Bones was released on DVD and Blu-ray (subtitled "Cradle to Grave Edition") in region 1 on October 11, 2011, in region 2 on October 17, 2011 and in region 4 on November 9, 2011. The set includes all 23 episodes of season six on a 6-disc DVD set and 4-disc Blu-ray set presented in anamorphic widescreen. Special features include two audio commentaries—"The Doctor in the Photo" by executive producers Hart Hanson, Stephen Nathan and Ian Toynton and "The Blackout in the Blizzard" by actors David Boreanaz and Emily Deschanel. Featurettes include "Breaking Down: The Blackout in the Blizzard" and "The Visual Effects of Bones". Also included are extended versions of "The Daredevil in the Mold" and "The Bikini in the Soup", a gag reel, and the pilot episode of the television series The Killing.

References 

General references

External links 
 
 

Season 6
2010 American television seasons
2011 American television seasons